Orygocera recordata is a moth of the family Oecophoridae. It is known from Magude District, Mozambique.

This species has a wingspan of 12 mm. The forewings are pale ochreous suffused with rosy-pinkish and irrorated (sprinkled) with brownish and a few blackish specks.

References

Orygocera
Moths of Sub-Saharan Africa
Lepidoptera of Mozambique
Endemic fauna of Mozambique
Moths described in 1921
Taxa named by Edward Meyrick